No Down Payment is a 1957 American drama film directed by Martin Ritt. It was written by Philip Yordan, who fronted for an uncredited and blacklisted Ben Maddow, and is based on the novel of the same name by John McPartland. The film stars Joanne Woodward, Sheree North, Tony Randall, Jeffrey Hunter, Cameron Mitchell, Patricia Owens, Barbara Rush, and Pat Hingle.

Set in a California subdivision, the story follows four neighbor couples facing problems such as alcoholism, racism and promiscuity. It received two BAFTA nominations for Best Film From Any Source and Best Foreign Actress (Joanne Woodward).

Plot 
New to the city's Sunrise Hills subdivision, electrical engineer David Martin and wife Jean are welcomed by their neighbors. They include appliance store manager Herman Kreitzer, auto mechanic Troy Boone and car salesman Jerry Flagg, and their respective wives.

Leola, the unhappy and restless wife of Troy, wants to have a child. A veteran who still clings to his achievements during the war, Troy has applied for the position of police chief. He refuses to discuss children until the job is his.

Frequently drunk Jerry awkwardly makes passes at the other men's wives, humiliating his own spouse, Isabelle. He also is heavily in debt, spending far too much on things he can't afford, and often comes up with 'make it big' ideas. He pressures a family to buy a car beyond their means, endangering his job.

David also has money problems. Jean strongly urges him to go into sales, a more lucrative field. But he is a skilled engineer who prefers to stick with what he knows best.

Herman has a valued employee, Iko, who wants to move into Sunrise Hills with his wife and live the suburban life like anybody else. But the racial bias of the time is obvious and Herman's wife dislikes the idea of risking the wrath of neighbors by giving Iko a reference.

Also the city council's president, Herman must inform Troy that he can't be police chief due to his lack of education. The volatile Troy gets drunk and sexually assaults David's wife Jean, then beats up David when confronted by the angry husband. During an altercation with Leola, after which she decides to leave, Troy is accidentally pinned under his car, and by the time it is lifted from him, he is dying in his wife's arms. 

Leola drives out of town as the others reassess their lives.

Cast

Production 
Robert Stack was offered the part of Troy Boone but turned it down because he disliked the character.

Reception 
David Bowie, upon receiving his first fan letter from America in 1967, wrote the fan back and mentioned this film: "I hope one day to get to America. My manager tells me lots about it as he has been there many times with other acts he manages. I was watching an old film on TV the other night called No Down Payment a great film, but rather depressing if it is a true reflection of The American Way Of Life."

References

External links 
 
 
 
 

1957 films
1957 drama films
1950s American films
1950s English-language films
20th Century Fox films
American black-and-white films
American drama films
CinemaScope films
Films based on American novels
Films directed by Martin Ritt
Films scored by Leigh Harline
Films set in California